Farnworth & Bold railway station served the Farnworth area of Widnes, England. The station was on the southern section of the St Helens and Runcorn Gap Railway which was later absorbed by the London and North Western Railway.

History
The station first appeared in public timetables in 1852 as plain Farnworth. Its name was changed to Farnworth & Bold on 2 January 1890. The station was closed to passengers on 18 June 1951, when passenger trains were withdrawn between Widnes and St Helens. It closed completely on 1 June 1964. The line through the station closed in 1981 and was subsequently lifted. The trackbed through the station and the station itself have been buried under the A557.

Services
In 1922 nine "Down" (northbound) trains a day called at Farnworth & Bold, 'One class only' (i.e. 3rd Class) and 'Week Days Only' (i.e. not Sundays). The "Up" service was similar. The trains' destinations were St Helens to the north and Ditton Junction to the south, with some travelling beyond to Runcorn or Liverpool Lime Street.

In 1951 the service was sparser but more complex. Six trains called in each direction, Monday to Friday, the early morning ones providing both 1st and 3rd Class accommodation. On Saturdays four trains called in each direction, 3rd Class only. No trains called on Sundays.

References

Notes

Sources

External links

The station on an 1888-1913 Overlay OS Map via National Library of Scotland
the station on a 1948 OS Map via npe maps
an illustrated history of the line via 8D Association

Former London and North Western Railway stations
Railway stations in Great Britain opened in 1852
Railway stations in Great Britain closed in 1951
1852 establishments in England
Disused railway stations in Cheshire